Stanwood may refer to:

Places
 Stanwood, Ontario, Canada

United States
 Stanwood, Iowa
 Stanwood, Michigan
 Stanwood, Washington
 Stanwood-Camano School District
 Stanwood High School
 Stanwood IOOF Public Hall
 Stanwood station

Other uses
Stanwood (automobile)
 SS Stanwood, British collier

People
 Stanwood  Baumgartner (1894–1955), American Major League Baseball pitcher and sportswriter 
 Stanwood Cobb (1881–1982), American educator, author and prominent Baháʼí member
 Stanwood Duval (born 1942), United States District Judge
 Cordelia Stanwood (1865–1958), American ornithologist and wildlife photographer
 Franklin Stanwood (1852–1888), American artist

See also